Crème (or creme) is a French word for 'cream', used in culinary terminology for various preparations:

 Cream, a high-fat dairy product made from milk
 Custard, a cooked, usually sweet mixture of dairy and eggs
 Crème liqueur, a sweet liqueur
 Cream soups, such as crème Ninon

See also
 
 Cream (disambiguation)